Leskovets may refer to:

 In Bulgaria (written in Cyrillic as Лесковец):
 Leskovets, Montana Province - a village in Berkovitsa municipality, Montana Province
 Leskovets, Pernik Province - a village in Pernik municipality, Pernik Province
 Leskovets, Vratsa Province - a village in Oryahovo municipality, Vratsa Province
 See also:
 Leskoec (Лескоец) in Macedonia
 Leskovac (Лесковац) in Serbia
 Lyaskovets (Лясковец) in Bulgaria